CCS, sometimes written as C.C.S., was a British musical group, led by blues guitarist Alexis Korner.  The name was derived as an abbreviation of Collective Consciousness Society.

Formed in 1970 by musical director John Cameron and record producer Mickie Most, CCS consisted largely of session musicians, and was created primarily as a recording outfit. The personnel also included Peter Thorup, vocals; Alan Parker, guitar; Harold McNair, flute; Herbie Flowers, bass; Roger Coulam, keyboards; Barry Morgan, drums; plus Don Lusher and Bill Geldard, trombone. Some of the musicians were also members of Blue Mink.

CCS are best known for their instrumental version of Led Zeppelin's 1969 track "Whole Lotta Love", which entered the UK Singles Chart in 1970, and was used as the theme music for the BBC pop programme Top of the Pops ("TOTP") for most of the 1970s, and, in a remixed version, between 1998 and 2003. Technically, the TOTP theme was not by CCS, but was recorded by the TOTP orchestra one morning before the day's rehearsals. Nevertheless, the band was conducted by John Cameron on that occasion and many of the musicians were CCS regulars. This enabled the production to tailor the tune to the correct duration and avoided the weekly payment of royalties to the record label.

Their highest-charting singles were the Donovan song "Walking", and "Tap Turns on the Water". They also recorded three albums, including cover versions of the old blues standard "Boom Boom", "Living in the Past", and "(I Can't Get No) Satisfaction" as well as original material.

Their single, "Brother", was used as the theme to Tom Browne's and Simon Bates' Sunday Top 40/20 Chart Rundown on BBC Radio 1 in the 1970s. Not widely known is that the band were also responsible for the first set of jingles for Manchester's Piccadilly Radio when the station launched in April 1974 – examples can be found on ex-Piccadilly presenter Jeff Cooper's website. The short-lived CCS broke up in 1973, while Alexis Korner moved on to form the group Snape.

Discography

Albums
 CCS, also known as Whole Lotta Love (RAK SRKA 6751) (October 1970)
 CCS, also known as C.C.S. 2 (RAK SRAK 503) (March 1972) – UK No. 23
 The Best Band in the Land (RAK SRAK 504) (September 1973)

Compilation albums
 The Best of C.C.S. (RAK SRAK 527) (1977)
 Whole Lotta Love  (EMI CDP 7 97553 2) (1991)
 A's, B's & Rarities (EMI Gold 560 2532) (2004)

Singles

References

External links
 
 
 
 
 Biography at www.mystrands.com
 Alexis Korner discography at alexis-korner.net
 CCS fansite at www.alexgitlin.com
 Jeff Cooper's tribute site featuring a number of jingles recorded by CCS for the station

English rock music groups
English blues rock musical groups
Musical groups established in 1970
Musical groups disestablished in 1973
1970 establishments in the United Kingdom
1973 disestablishments in the United Kingdom
Rak Records artists